The Priestess of Demeter and Kore, sometimes referred to as the High Priestess of Demeter, was the High Priestess of the Goddesses Demeter and Persephone (Kore) in the Telesterion in Eleusis in Ancient Athens. It was one of the highest religious offices in Ancient Athens, and its holder enjoyed great prestige. It was likely the oldest priesthood in Athens, and also the most lucrative priesthood in all of Attica. 

The Priestess officiated during the famous Eleusinian Mysteries. She also officiated during lesser festivals, such as the Thesmophoria and the Haloa. 

The office could not have survived the ban of all non-Christian priesthoods during the persecution of pagans in the late Roman Empire.

See also
 High Priestess of Athena Polias
 Priestess of Hera at Argos
 Sacerdos Cereris

References

 Joan Breton Connelly, Portrait of a Priestess: Women and Ritual in Ancient Greece
 Garland, Robert, Religion and the Greeks, Bristol Classical Press, London, 1994

Ancient Athenian religious titles
Demeter
Ancient Greek priestesses
Persephone